Below is a sortable list of compositions by Tōru Takemitsu.  The works are categorized by genre, date of composition, titles and scoring.

Scores by Takemitsu are published by Ongaku No Tomo Sha, C.F. Peters, Éditions Salabert, Schott Japan, and Universal Edition.

External links
Toru Takemitsu: Complete Works
Complete Takemitsu Edition 

Takemitsu, Toru, compositions by